The oblasts of the Soviet Union were second-level administrative units of the Soviet Union, and first-level entities of the republics of the Soviet Union.

Terminology
Oblast is a Slavic term that exists in the Russian language. Russian was official in all republics.

By location

Baltic region

In the 1950s there were 10 oblasts in the three Baltic republics.

 1953-04-28 Law on abolition of Pärnu, Tallinn and Tartu oblasts (Estonia) 
 1953-04-25 Law on abolition of Riga, Daugavpils and Liepāja oblasts (Latvia) 
 1953-05-28 Law on abolition of Vilnius, Kaunas, Klaipėda and Šiauliai oblasts (Lithuania)

Transcaucasian region

In the 1950s there were 4 oblasts in the two Transcaucasian republics (only in Azerbaijan and Georgia).

 1953-04-23 Law on abolition of Baku and Ganja oblasts (Azerbaijan) 
 1953-04-23 Law on abolition of Kutaisi and Tbilisi oblasts (Georgia)

List

See also 
 Oblasts of Russia
 Oblasts of the Russian Empire
 Oblast

References

Notes

 
Subdivisions of the Soviet Union